Jorge Mario Alfaro Buelvas (born June 11, 1993) is a Colombian professional baseball catcher in the Boston Red Sox organization. He has previously played in Major League Baseball (MLB) for the Philadelphia Phillies, Miami Marlins. and San Diego Padres. Alfaro signed with the Texas Rangers as a free agent in 2010, was traded to the Phillies in 2015, and made his MLB debut in 2016.

Early and personal life
Alfaro was born in Sincelejo, Colombia. Alfaro's younger brother Jhoandro is a catcher in the Chicago White Sox organization. Alfaro played baseball and soccer at Instituto Técnico Industrial Antonio Prieto, graduating in 2009.

Career

Texas Rangers organization
Alfaro signed with the Texas Rangers in June 2010 as a 16-year-old free agent for a $1.3 million signing bonus that was a record at the time for any Colombian prospect. In 2010, playing for the DSL Rangers in the Dominican Summer League he batted .221/.278/.291 with one home run and 23 runs batted in (RBIs).

In 2011, playing for the Class A Short-Season Spokane Indians in the Northwest League, Alfaro batted .300/.345/.481 (9th in the league) with six home runs, 23 RBIs, and seven hit by pitch (6th) in 160 at bats, as on defense he allowed 12 passed balls and made 10 errors in 36 games at catcher.  He was a Baseball America Short-Season All Star and a Topps Short-Season/Rookie All Star, and Baseball America named him the 8th-best prospect in the Northwest League.

In 2012, playing for the Class A Hickory Crawdads in the South Atlantic League, he batted .261/.320/.430 with five home runs and 34 RBIs in 272 at bats. Baseball America rated Alfaro the 9th-best Rangers prospect.

Prior to the 2013 season Alfaro was ranked by MLB.com as the 88th-best prospect in baseball. Alfaro was ranked the 54th-best prospect by Baseball America. In 2013, playing for Hickory in the South Atlantic League, he was a mid-season All Star, an MiLB.com Texas Organization All Star, and an All-Star Futures Game selection. He batted .258/.338/.452 with 16 home runs, 53 RBIs, and 18 hit by pitch (leading the league) in 372 at bats, as on defense he allowed 26 passed balls and made 10 errors in 82 games at catcher. Baseball America named him the 14th-best prospect in the South Atlantic League. He also had 21 at bats with the AZL Rangers, and 11 at bats with the Myrtle Beach Pelicans. After the 2013 season he played for the Surprise Saguaros in the Arizona Fall League, where he was batted .386 (3rd in the league)/.438 (9th)/.500 with 18 runs (5th), six doubles (6th), 11 RBIs, and three hit by pitch (2nd) in 70 at bats. He was named both a Rising Star and to the All-Prospect Team.

In 2014 playing for Class A-Advanced Myrtle Beach he was Carolina League Player of the Week on August 4, a mid-season All Star, an MiLB Texas Organization All Star, and a post-season All Star. Alfaro was also the starting catcher for the World Squad at the All-Star Futures Game.  For the season, he batted .261/.318/.440 with five triples (10th in the league), 13 home runs (6th), 73 RBIs (3rd), and 12 hit by pitch (4th), as on defense he allowed 18 passed balls and made 13 errors at catcher in 75 games. Baseball America named him the second-best prospect in the Carolina League. He also had 88 at bats with the Double-A Frisco RoughRiders of the Texas League, batting .261/.343/.443 with four home runs and 14 RBIs.

On November 20, 2014, the Rangers added Alfaro to their 40-man roster to protect him from being selected in the Rule 5 draft. In 2015 playing for Frisco he was a mid-season All Star, and batted .253/.314/.432 with five home runs and 21 RBIs in 190 at bats.

Philadelphia Phillies
On July 31, 2015, the Rangers traded Alfaro, Nick Williams, Matt Harrison, Jake Thompson, Alec Asher, and Jerad Eickhoff to the Philadelphia Phillies for Cole Hamels and Jake Diekman. In the remainder of 2015 he had four at bats with the GCL Phillies. Baseball America named him the 5th-best prospect in the Phillies minor league system.

In 2016 playing for the Double-A Reading Fightin Phils he was an Eastern League Player of the Week and Phillies Minor League Player of the Week on April 17, Phillies Minor League Defender of the Month for July, a mid-season All Star, and an MiLB Philadelphia Organization All Star.  The Phillies promoted Alfaro to the major leagues on August 26. Alfaro was optioned back to Reading the next day. He was recalled on September 11 after the Reading season ended; he had batted .285/.325/.458 in Reading with 15 home runs (6th in the league), 67 RBIs (9th) and 105 strikeouts (tied for 5th) in 404 at bats. He had a total of 16 major league at bats in 2016, in which he had two hits and eight strikeouts.

Alfaro played for Team Colombia in the 2017 World Baseball Classic. He entered 2017 ranked by MLB Pipeline as the No. 72 prospect, and the Phillies' No. 3 prospect.

In 2017 he batted .318/.360/.514 with five home runs and 14 RBIs in 107 major league at bats. Alfaro also had the second-fastest baserunning sprint speed of all major league catchers, at 28.1 feet/second.  He had the highest batting average on balls in play of all major league hitters with 100 or more at bats, at .420, swung at the highest percentage of balls outside the strike zone of all NL batters, at 46.2%, and swung and missed at an MLB-leading 21.7% of the pitches he saw. With the Class AAA Lehigh Valley IronPigs of the International League, Alfaro was a mid-season All Star, and for the season he batted .241/.291/.358 with seven home runs and 43 RBIs in 324 at bats.

In 2018 with the Phillies, Alfaro batted .262/.324/.407 with 10 home runs, 37 RBIs, and 14 hit by pitch (8th in the National League) in 344 major league at bats. He had the highest batting average on balls in play of all major league hitters with 300 or more at bats, at .406. He also had the second-fastest baserunning sprint speed of all major league catchers, at 28.3 feet/second.  On the other hand, he struck out 36.6% of the time, the highest rate in the National League and third-highest among all players in MLB with 300 or more plate appearances. He swung and missed at an MLB-leading 23.8% of the pitches he saw (the next-highest rate was Avisail Garcia's 19.0%), and swung at the highest percentage of balls outside the strike zone of all NL batters, at 46.9% (while having the lowest contact percentage with pitches outside the strike zone of all NL batters, at 42.9%).

On defense, in 2018 he had the best arm strength (90.8) and the third-best average pop time to second base (1.94 seconds) of all major league catchers, while he ranked fourth among all catchers in pitch framing according to Baseball Prospectus. He led the NL in catcher's ERA (3.45), and his 9.11 range factor per game ranked 2nd among National League catchers.  However, Alfaro also led all NL catchers in passed balls (10) and stolen bases allowed (59; though he tied for 3rd in runners caught stealing (21)), and tied for first in errors (11).  Baseball America named him to its 2018 MLB All-Rookie Team.

Miami Marlins
On February 7, 2019, Alfaro was traded with Sixto Sánchez, Will Stewart, and $250,000 in international bonus slot money to the Miami Marlins in exchange for J. T. Realmuto. 

In 2019, he batted .262/.312/.425, and was 2nd in the NL with 11 passed balls, and 3rd with 11 errors. He had the fastest sprint speed of all major league catchers, at 28.8 feet/second.

In 2020 he batted .226/.280/.344, and was 2nd in the NL with 4 passed balls. He had the lowest framing percentage of all major league catchers.

In 2021, he batted .244/.283/.342 in 92 games. After July he was moved to left field, where he played for the majority of August and September.

San Diego Padres
On November 30, 2021, the Marlins traded Alfaro to the San Diego Padres in exchange for cash or a player to be named later, which turned out to be cash considerations. During the 2022 season,  Alfaro had four walk-off hits through September 7.

On November 18, 2022, Alfaro was non-tendered by the Padres and became a free agent.

Boston Red Sox
In January 2023, Alfaro signed a minor-league contract with the Boston Red Sox and was named a non-roster invitee to spring training.

References

External links

Jorge Alfaro at SABR (Baseball BioProject)
Jorge Alfaro at Pura Pelota (Venezuelan Professional Baseball League)

1993 births
Living people
People from Sincelejo
Arizona League Rangers players
Colombian expatriate baseball players in the United States
Dominican Summer League Rangers players
Colombian expatriate baseball players in the Dominican Republic
Frisco RoughRiders players
Florida Complex League Phillies players
Hickory Crawdads players
Jacksonville Jumbo Shrimp players
Lehigh Valley IronPigs players
Leones de Ponce players
Colombian expatriate baseball players in Puerto Rico
Major League Baseball players from Colombia
Major League Baseball catchers
Miami Marlins players
Myrtle Beach Pelicans players
Philadelphia Phillies players
Reading Fightin Phils players
San Diego Padres players
Spokane Indians players
Surprise Saguaros players
Tiburones de La Guaira players
Colombian expatriate baseball players in Venezuela
2017 World Baseball Classic players
2023 World Baseball Classic players